Étienne Thobois (born 20 September 1967) is a French badminton player. He competed in the men's singles tournament at the 1996 Summer Olympics. He serves as director general of the Paris Organising Committee for the 2024 Olympic and Paralympic Games.

References

External links
 

1967 births
Living people
French male badminton players
Olympic badminton players of France
Badminton players at the 1996 Summer Olympics
Place of birth missing (living people)